Thomas Jerald Huckaby (born July 19, 1941) is an American politician who served in the United States House of Representatives from  from 1977 to 1993.

He lost his reelection bid in 1992 to Jim McCrery.

References

External links

 

|-

1941 births
Living people
Minden High School (Minden, Louisiana) alumni
Georgia State University alumni
Louisiana State University alumni
People from Jackson Parish, Louisiana
Politicians from Minden, Louisiana
People from Ringgold, Louisiana
Businesspeople from Chicago
Businesspeople from Atlanta
People from McLean, Virginia
People from Choudrant, Louisiana
Farmers from Louisiana
Businesspeople from Virginia
Democratic Party members of the United States House of Representatives from Louisiana
American United Methodists
People from Great Falls, Virginia